Elections to South Lanarkshire Council took place on 3 May 2012 on the same day as the 31 other Scottish local government elections.

Labour retained their position as the largest party on the council as they gained three seat from 2007 but were one seat short of an overall majority. The Scottish National Party (SNP) also increased their representation and remained in second place on the authority after gaining four seats to hold 28. The Conservatives lost the majority of their seats as they fell from eight to three. One less independent candidate was elected with two returned and the remaining seat was won by the Liberal Democrats who lost one seat. 

Labour initially formed a minority administration to run the council before, in February 2013, they took overall control of South Lanarkshire Council after winning a by-election from the SNP.

Election result

Source: 

Note: Votes are the sum of first preference votes across all council wards. The net gain/loss and percentage changes relate to the result of the previous Scottish local elections on 3 May 2007. This is because STV has an element of proportionality which is not present unless multiple seats are being elected. This may differ from other published sources showing gain/loss relative to seats held at the dissolution of Scotland's councils.

Ward results

Clydesdale West
The SNP retained both the seats they had won at the previous election while Labour held their only seat and gained one seat from the Conservatives.

Clydesdale North
Labour and the SNP held the seats they had won at the previous election while independent candidate Ed Archer gained a seat from the Conservatives.

Clydesdale East
The SNP held the seat they had won at the previous election while the Conservatives held one of their two seats and Labour gained one seat from the Conservatives.

Clydesdale South
Labour (2) and the SNP (1) retained the seats they had won at the previous election.

Avondale and Stonehouse
The SNP retained the seat they had won at the previous election and gained a further seat to hold two while Labour held their only seat. Cllr Graeme Campbell, who had been elected as a Conservative in 2007, retained his seat as an independent candidate and the Conservatives lost their only seat. Independent candidate Jim Malloy was elected as a Labour candidate in 2007.

East Kilbride South
The SNP (2) and Labour (1) retained the seats they had won at the previous election.

East Kilbride Central South
Labour (2) and the SNP (1) retained the seats they had won at the previous election.

East Kilbride Central North
The SNP (2) and Labour (2) retained the seats they had won at the previous election.

East Kilbride West
Labour, the SNP and the Conservatives (one each) retained the seats that they had won at the previous election.

East Kilbride East
The SNP held the seat they had won at the previous election and gained one seat from Labour while Labour held one of their two seats.

Rutherglen South
Labour, the Liberal Democrats and the SNP retained the seats they had won at the previous election.

Rutherglen Central and North
Labour (2) and the SNP (1) retained the seats they had won at the previous election.

Cambuslang West
Labour retained the seat they had won at the previous election and gained one seat from the Liberal Democrats while the SNP retained their only seat.

Cambuslang East
Labour (2) and the SNP (1) retained the seats they had won at the previous election.

Blantyre
Labour retained both of the seats they had won at the previous election and gained one seat while the SNP retained the seat they had won at the previous election. In 2007, Cllr Bert Thomson was elected as an independent candidate. He retained his seat as an SNP candidate.

Bothwell and Uddingston
The SNP, Labour and the Conservatives retained the seats they had won at the previous election.

Hamilton North and East
Labour (2) and the SNP (1) retained the seats they had won at the previous election.

Hamilton West and Earnock
Labour (2) and the SNP (1) retained the seats they had won at the previous election while the SNP gained one seat from independent former councillor Tommy Gilligan. Cllr John Menzies was elected following a by-election in 2011 and retained his seat.

Hamilton South
Labour retained both the seats they had won at the previous election while the SNP retained one seat and gained one seat from the Conservatives.

Larkhall
Labour (2) and the SNP (2) retained the seats they had won at the previous election.

By-elections

Rutherglen South
SNP councillor Anne Higgins died on 20 November 2012. A by-election was held on 14 February 2013 and was won by Labour's Gerard Killen which gave the party an overall majority on the council.

Hamilton South 2013
SNP councillor Bobby Lawson died on 13 August 2013. A by-election was held on 24 October 2013 and was won by Labour's Stuart Gallacher.

Clydesdale South
SNP councillor Archie Manson resigned on 14 March 2014 on health grounds. A by-election was held on 5 June 2014 and won by Labour's Gordon Muir.

Hamilton South 2015
SNP councillor Angela Crawley was elected as MP for Lanark and Hamilton East on 7 May 2015. She resigned her council seat on 22 May 2015. A by-election was held on 6 August 2015 and was won by the SNP's John Ross.

Blantyre
Labour councillor Jim Handibode died on 19 September 2015. A by-election was held to fill the vacancy on 10 December 2015 and was won by Labour's Mo Razzaq.

Hamilton North and East
SNP councillor Lynn Adams died on 21 September 2015. A by-election was held on 21 January 2016 to fill the vacancy, won by the party's Stephanie Callaghan.

Notes

References

2012
2012 Scottish local elections
21st century in South Lanarkshire